Nidhogg 2 is a fighting game and sequel to Nidhogg by indie developer Messhof. It was released for Microsoft Windows, macOS and PlayStation 4 in 2017. An Xbox One version was released in July 2018 and the Nintendo Switch version was released in November 2018. The game received generally positive reviews from critics upon release.

Gameplay
Nidhogg 2 is a fighting game in which two players duel against each other. The player has to reach the end of their opponent's side first to win. Players have a variety of moves, including sliding and leaping. They can deflect their opponents' attacks. Weapons, such as daggers, throwing knives and bows, as well as a character creator, are introduced.

Development 

The title was announced in September 2016 and demonstrated at the 2016 TwitchCon and 2017 Electronic Entertainment Expo Indie Megabooth. It was released on August 15, 2017, on macOS, PlayStation 4, and Microsoft Windows platforms. A Nintendo Switch version was released on November 22, 2018. Unlike the original game, which features a minimalistic art style, the game's creator Mark Essen and artist Toby Dixon decided to use a more detailed graphical style with a higher resolution so as to reflect the game's increased depth. Another reason for the change is that Essen considered Nidhogg 2 a "spectator game". The art style allowed spectators to have more things to look at when they were watching the gameplay.

Reception 

The game received "generally favorable" reviews, according to review aggregator Metacritic. GamesMaster said it was "An excellent sword-fighting game that at times has trouble remembering its brilliant roots." Game Informer said, "Though it doesn’t add much for players looking to play around with its improvements solo, Nidhogg 2 adds layers of depth to a simple formula without breaking what made it so appealing in the first place." Destructoid said, "It has expanded on the wonderful mechanics of the original and has one of the best soundtracks in recent memory. There isn't much content here for the solo player, but if you've got friends coming over for some friendly competition, the night would not be complete without Nidhogg 2." PlayStation Official Magazine – UK said it had "wicked local multiplayer appeal", while GamesTM said it was "Fast, intense, but flawed".

The game was nominated for "Best Fighting Game" and "Best Multiplayer" in IGN's Best of 2017 Awards.

Accolades

See also

References

Further reading

External links 
 

2017 video games
Fighting games
Indie video games
MacOS games
PlayStation 4 games
Windows games
Multiplayer and single-player video games
Video games developed in the United States
Nintendo Switch games
Video game sequels
Xbox One games
GameMaker Studio games